Elicarlos Souza Santos (born 8 July 1985 in Laranjeiras, Sergipe), simply known as Elicarlos, is a Brazilian footballer as a defensive midfielder for Botafogo-SP.

Career
Elicarlos began his career with Porto, starting in the youth team before being promoted to the first-team in 2006. He wasn't with the first-team of Porto long as he agreed to join Náutico on loan for two seasons, he scored once in 34 league matches for Náutico before returning to his parent club. Months after his loan spell at Náutico had ended, Elicarlos was on the move again as he joined Cruzeiro permanently. 33 appearances and one goal followed for him at Cruzeiro, during his time with the club he won the 2008 Campeonato Mineiro and the 2009 Campeonato Mineiro while also making his continental debut in the 2009 Copa Libertadores.

In 2011, he rejoined former loan club Náutico on a full-time contract. His second debut for the club came against Elicarlos' first club, Porto, in the 2011 Campeonato Pernambucano. He subsequently made 17 appearances in the aforementioned competition. He went on to make a total of 122 league appearances for Náutico whilst scoring 7 goals. He remained with the club between 2011 and 2016, a spell that included a loan move to Chapecoense, before departing to join Figueirense where he was assigned the number 85 shirt. His Figueirense debut came in the 2016 Primeira Liga against Flamengo.

Honours
Cruzeiro
Campeonato Mineiro (2): 2008, 2009

References

External links
 football-lineups
 globoesporte
 websoccerclub

1985 births
Living people
Sportspeople from Sergipe
Brazilian footballers
Association football midfielders
Campeonato Brasileiro Série A players
Campeonato Brasileiro Série B players
Clube Atlético do Porto players
Clube Náutico Capibaribe players
Cruzeiro Esporte Clube players
Associação Chapecoense de Futebol players
Figueirense FC players